Bryce may refer to:

People
Bryce (given name)
Bryce (surname)

Places
Bryce Canyon National Park
Mount Bryce
Bryce, Utah
Bryce, Arizona

Other
Bryce (software)
Bryce Hospital

See also
Brice (disambiguation)